Abol ol Firuz (also Romanized as Abol ol Fīrūz and Abol Firooz; also known as Abol, Abū ol Fīrūz, and Labal) is a village in Howmeh Rural District, in the Central District of Dashtestan County, Bushehr Province, Iran. At the 2006 census, its population was 395, in 89 families.

References 

Populated places in Dashtestan County